Areni is a village and the center of the Areni Municipality of the Vayots Dzor Province in Armenia. Areni is best known for its wine production, with the majority of wine produced locally from the nearby village of Getap. 

The Astvatsatsin Church of Areni in the village, is a single-nave two-aisled domed Armenian church completed in the year 1321, and is located atop a plateau overlooking the Arpa River and Areni. The church was designed by the architect and sculptor Momik who is best known for his high-relief carvings at the monastery of Noravank (located approximately 6 kilometers southeast from Areni).

Nearby are also the 13th century ruins of lord Tarsaitch Orbelian of Syunik's palace, moved from Yeghegis to Areni during that time. Ruins of a 13th-century bridge built by Bishop Sarkis in 1265-1287 are one kilometer northeast of the church. At the same location are the remains of an older bridge.

Nature  

Natural habitats include semidesert, calcareous grasslands, and juniper woodlands alternated with cliffs, canyons, and rocky outcrops. Vicinity of Areni community have been considered as a Prime Butterfly Area, where a wide variety of rare butterflies, including Papilio alexanor, Colias chlorocoma, Colias aurorina, Pseudochazara schahrudensis, Tomares romanovi, Callophrys paulae, and a number of others can be observed.

Also the area is interesting for bird observations, being inhabited by Egyptian Vulture, White-throated Robin, Eastern Rock Nuthatch, Black-headed Bunting, and number of other species.

Copper Age excavations 

In 2007, an Armenian-Irish team decided to do test excavations in the cave site of Areni 1.  Two test trenches in the front and rear galleries revealed Chalcolithic Age and Early Bronze Age layers dating back to 5000-4000 BCE.  Excavations during 2007-2008 uncovered 3 pot burials in the rear chamber of the cave.  Each pot contained a Copper Age human skull with no associated grave goods. All skulls belong to subadults of 9–16 years of age.  These are currently being analyzed by the team's biological anthropologist. Remarkably, one skull contained a piece of a well-preserved brain tissue.  This is the oldest known human brain from the Old World.

The cave has also offered surprising new insights into the origins of modern civilizations, such as evidence of a wine-making enterprise and an array of culturally diverse pottery. Excavations also yielded an extensive array of Copper Age artifacts dating to between 4,200 and 3,900 BCE.  The new discoveries within the cave move early bronze-age cultural activity in Armenia back by about 800 years.  Additional discoveries at the site include metal knives, seeds from more than 30 types of fruit, remains of dozens of cereal species, rope, cloth, straw, grass, reeds and dried grapes and prunes.

In January 2011 archaeologists announced the discovery of the earliest known winery, the Areni-1 winery, seven months after the world's oldest leather shoe, the Areni-1 shoe, was discovered in the same cave. The winery, which is over six-thousand years old, contains a wine press, fermentation vats, jars, and cups. Archaeologists also found grape seeds and vines of the species Vitis vinifera. Patrick McGovern, a biomolecular anthropologist at the University of Pennsylvania, commenting on the importance of the find, said, "The fact that winemaking was already so well-developed in 4000 BC suggests that the technology probably goes back much earlier."

Novel
In August 2014, a fiction alternative history novel entitled Origins: Discovery was released that featured the village of Arpa (which was renamed Areni in the late 1930s) during the period 1930 until 1952, and the Areni-1 Cave.

Gallery

References

External links 

 
 
 
 Butterfly Conservation Armenia: Gnishik PBA. http://www.butterfly-conservation-armenia.org/gnisheek.html
 Armenian Bird Census Council: Birdwatching. https://web.archive.org/web/20161226055914/http://www.abcc-am.org/birdwatching.html
 Hin Areni Winery

 
Archaeological sites in Armenia
Populated places in Vayots Dzor Province